Like a Love Story is a historical, young adult romance novel by Abdi Nazemian, published June 4, 2019 by Balzer + Bray. The story follows Reza, an Iranian boy, as he grapples with his homosexuality amid the AIDS crisis in New York City.

Plot 
Like a Love Story follows three main characters: Reza, Judy, and Art.

At the beginning of the story, Reza, an Iranian boy, moves to New York City from Toronto with his mother to live with his stepfather and stepbrother. Living amidst the AIDS crisis, Reza fears coming out as homosexual.

Reza quickly befriends Judy, an aspiring fashion designer, and her best friend, Art, the high school's only out and proud homosexual person. Despite Reza's immediate attraction toward Art, he begins dating Judy. Eventually, Art and Reza address their attraction, forcing Reza to come out to his family before they can become a couple.

Beyond the burgeoning romance, Like a Love Story considers the AIDS epidemic in New York City as Judy's Uncle Steven dies from the disease, Art photographs people with AIDS, and the characters participate in ACT UP demonstrations.

Reception 
Like a Love Story received positive reviews from Common Sense Media and Kirkus Reviews, including starred reviews from Publishers Weekly, Quill & Quire, BookPage, and Booklist. Time magazine named it one of the best young adult novels of all time. The book also received the following accolades:

 American Library Association Best Fiction for Young Adults Top Ten (2020)
 Stonewall Book Award for Children's and Young Adult Literature Honor Book (2019)

References

See also 

American young adult novels
American historical novels
Novels set in New York City
2019 American novels
2019 LGBT-related literary works
American LGBT novels
LGBT-related young adult novels
2010s LGBT novels
Stonewall Book Award-winning works
Novels about HIV/AIDS
Balzer + Bray books
2019 children's books